Poecilips fallax is small beetle of the subfamily Scolytinae. The beetle, related to carver beetles, is a pest to mangrove trees especially Rhizophora mucronata and Rhizophora apiculata.

The adults oviposit or insert their eggs into the hypocotyls before the seed matures or drops to the mud below. When the eggs hatch, the larvae bore tunnels leading away from oviposition site. These tunnels get longer and larger as the larve gets farther.  The larvae and adults feed on the content of the hypocotyl, distorting its shape, incapacitating it to germinate and eventually rot. When the larvae complete their growth, they pupate at the end of the tunnels and emerge through a round hole from the hypocotyl.

References 

Scolytinae
Beetles described in 1927